Valvoline Inc. is an American manufacturer and distributor of Valvoline-brand automotive oil, additives, and lubricants. It also owns the Valvoline Instant Oil Change and Valvoline Express Care chains of car repair centers. , it is the second largest oil change service provider in the United States with 10% market share and 1,400 locations.

History 

Dr. John Ellis, the inventor of a petroleum lubricant for steam engines, founded Valvoline on September 6, 1866, in Binghamton, New York, as the "Continuous Oil Refining Company". In 1868, Ellis renamed his Binghamton Cylinder Oil to the more memorable Valvoline. The next year, he moved the Continuous Oil Refining Company to Brooklyn. With his son and son-in-law, Ellis renamed the company to "Ellis & Leonard" and relocated to Shadyside, New Jersey. Valvoline received commendations by Charles F. Chandler and others at the Paris Exhibition of 1878. By the 1890s, Valvoline oil was associated with winning race cars. During the early 20th century, Valvoline was the recommended motor oil for the Ford Model T.

In 1949, Ashland Inc. purchased the Freedom-Valvoline Company. By 2016, Ashland's Valvoline subsidiary accounted for about 37% of the parent company's annual revenue. Valvoline completed an initial public offering on the New York Stock Exchange on September 22, 2016, ahead of Ashland spinning off Valvoline as an independent company on May 5, 2017. On August 1, 2022, Saudi Aramco announced the acquisition of Valvoline's lubricant unit for US$2.65billion.

Sponsorships 

Valvoline sponsored a number of auto races to market its motor oil, including the SCCA National Championship Runoffs and Bommarito Automotive Group 500. Valvoline also sponsored NASCAR Cup Series driver Mark Martin (1992-2000), CART driver Al Unser Jr. (1988-1993), and NASCAR teams RahMoc Enterprises, and Ginn Racing and Hendrick Motorsports (since 2014).

In Australia, Valvoline owns naming rights to the Sydney Speedway and sponsors the Australian Sprintcar Grand Prix. It also sponsored the 1994 Australian Manufacturers' Championship.

Valvoline was also the official lubricant supplier for Marussia F1 Team in 2014 (later Manor Marussia F1 Team in 2015), but the team didn't show the Valvoline logo branding on Marussia F1 cars despite utilizing Ferrari engines.

Since June 2020, Valvoline sponsors La Liga association club Sevilla FC as a global partner, with their logo appearing on the sleeves of match kits.

References

External links

 

1866 establishments in New York (state)
American companies established in 1866
Chemical companies of the United States
Petrochemical companies
Companies based in Lexington, Kentucky
Companies listed on the New York Stock Exchange
Manufacturing companies based in Kentucky
Non-renewable resource companies established in 1866
Chemical companies established in 1866
Corporate spin-offs
1949 mergers and acquisitions
2016 initial public offerings